opened in Yamaguchi, Yamaguchi Prefecture, Japan, in 1959 as the country's first dedicated modern archival institution.

History
These items were transferred in with the opening of Yamaguchi Prefectural Archives in 1959; donations and deposits - including materials from the Tokuyama Domain Mōri family - have continued since.

Holdings
The archives holds approximately 530,000 documents, roughly divided into five groups:
 Domain documents, including:
 
 
 
 Administrative documents, from the Meiji era onwards
 Administrative materials, from the Meiji era onwards
 Publications, photographs, films, audio recordings, etc.
 Family documents, including:
 Corporation, foundation, and family documents, including those of Edo period samurai houses
 Special library
Textbooks, newspapers, etc.

Cultural Properties
The holdings include seven Important Cultural Properties, two Prefectural Cultural Properties, and three Municipal Tangible Cultural Properties.

Important Cultural Properties
 : 121 items, dating from the Kamakura period to the Edo period, together with a map of the Nagato Province Masayoshi Irie Salt Fields
 : 255 documents mounted as 13 scrolls, dating from the Kamakura period to the Edo period
 : 117 items, dating from 1351–1643, together with a Japan-Ming trade ship flag of Wanli 12 (1584)
 : 59 woodblocks of the Muromachi period
 : 199 items from the sixteenth century, together with a flag pass of Tenshō 9 (1581)
 : 13,549 items, dating from the Edo period to the Shōwa era
 : 6 construction records and 5 plans, from the Taishō era

Prefectural Cultural Properties
 : 754 items, including a portrait inscribed by Yoshida in the fifth month of Ansei 6 (1859), and his zeppitsu or final writing (Tangible Cultural Property)
 : 1,011 documents (Tangible Folk Cultural Property)

From the archives

See also

 List of archives in Japan
 Yamaguchi Prefectural Museum
 List of Historic Sites of Japan (Yamaguchi)
 Cultural Property (Japan)

References

External links
  Yamaguchi Prefectural Archives
  Yamaguchi Prefectural Archives

Archives in Japan
Yamaguchi (city)
History of Yamaguchi Prefecture
1959 establishments in Japan